Malekeh Nayiny (born 1955) is an Iranian-born French artist, known for her digital photo collage and paintings. Her best known series of work is "Updating a Family Album" (1997–present). She lives and works in Paris.

Biography 
Malekeh Nayiny was born in 1955 in Tehran, Iran. She received a B.A. degree in fine arts and photography from Syracuse University, continuing her studies at the Parsons School of Design and the International Center of Photography. She earned a certificate in digital photography from the Spéos Paris Photographic Institute in 1997.

Nayiny's work has appeared in exhibitions in Dubai, Paris, London, Torino, New York City, Houston, Madrid, Cahors, Valencia, Geneva, Verona, Tehran and Portugal. In 2019 her work was included in the exhibition My Iran: Six Women Photographers along with Hengameh Golestan, Newsha Tavakolian, Shadi Ghadirian,  Gohar Dashti, and Mitra Tabrizian at the Arthur M. Sackler Gallery.

Her work is included in the collections of the Arthur M. Sackler Gallery, the British Museum, and the Los Angeles County Museum of Art,

References

External links 
 

1955 births
Living people
20th-century Iranian women artists
21st-century Iranian women artists
Iranian photographers
People from Tehran
Artists from Paris
Syracuse University alumni
Parsons School of Design alumni

Iranian emigrants to France
Iranian women photographers
20th-century Iranian artists
21st-century Iranian artists
20th-century women photographers
21st-century women photographers